Amangal is a municipality in Ranga Reddy district of the Indian state of Telangana. It is under Kalwkurthy vidhan sabha. It is located in Amangal mandal of Kandukur revenue division.

Geography 

History
The Recharla Padmanayaka dynasty ruled Amangal as its capital in 13th century. Padmanayaka dynasty were the feudatories of Kakateeya kings. They ruled South part of Kakateeya kingdom with their capitals as Amangal, Rachakonda and Devarakonda.

References 

Villages in Mahbubnagar district